Cartoon Violence is the second studio album indie rock band Herzog, released on March 19, 2012 on Exit Stencil Recordings. It was recorded more collaboratively than their debut album, Search, with Nick Tolar assisted by Tony Vorell, who wrote the album's lyrics.

Reception

The Skinny gave the album a moderately positive review and described the album's sound as "all Beach Boys-style rolling harmonies and full-blooded power-chord choruses." Another such review came from Loud and Quiet, who wrote, "rather than taking influence from the noughties pop-punk, they at times simply recreate it," and Bill Losey of the Ventura County Star called the album "fun, fun, fun."

Track listing
Fuck this Year
Rock and Roll Monster
You Clean Up Nice
Rich People Ballad
Dreaming Man II
Feedback
Your Son is not a Soldier
Shakespearean Actress
Alexander the Great

Personnel
Brian Hill (bass) 
Dave McHenry (guitar, vocals) 
Dan Price (drums, vocals) 
Nick Tolar (guitar, vocals) 
Tony Vorell (lyrics, non-playing)

References

2012 albums
Herzog (band) albums